Seal Point is a point which extends north from the southeast shore of Hope Bay between Eagle Cove and Hut Cove, at the northeast end of Antarctic Peninsula. Discovered by a party under J. Gunnar Andersson of the Swedish Antarctic Expedition, 1901–04, and so named because the party relieved their shortage of food and fuel by killing a seal on this point.

Headlands of Trinity Peninsula